Jan A. J. Schuurkes (born 1950, in Oisterwijk) is a Dutch biologist and gastrointestinal researcher.

Education
He graduated as a biochemist at the Catholic University of Nijmegen (Nijmegen). He obtained a PhD in Medicine at Utrecht University (Utrecht) with a thesis on Motility and hemodynamics of the canine gastrointestinal tract.

Career
In 1979, he started his career at Janssen Pharmaceutica, where he became assistant head of the Department of Pharmacodynamics, head of the Department of Gastrointestinal pharmacology and finally vice-president Gastrointestinal Discovery. In 2007, he founded a new pharmaceutical company, Movetis, together with Remi Van den Broeck, Staf Van Reet and Dirk Reyn.

Awards
 1997, Dr. Paul Janssen award.

References
 Schuurkes JA, Tukker JJ, The interdigestive colonic motor complex of the dog, Arch Int Pharmacodyn Ther. 1980 Oct;247(2):329-34.
 Schuurkes JA., Pharmacotherapy of gastrointestinal motor disorders, Rev Gastroenterol Mex. 1994 Apr-Jun;59(2):165-70.
 Schuurkes JA, Meulemans AL., Nitric oxide and gastric relaxation, Dig Dis Sci. 1994 Dec;39(12 Suppl):79S-81S.

Sources
 KBC Private Equity en KBC Private Equity Fund Biotech investeren 7 miljoen euro in 49 miljoen euro private financieringsronde van Movetis (Dutch)
 Alarm in de darm BW

1950 births
Living people
Dutch medical researchers
Janssen Pharmaceutica people
People from Oisterwijk